Robert C. Johnson (27 June 1902 – 26 January 1981) was an Australian rules footballer who played for Melbourne in the Victorian Football League (VFL). His son Bob followed in his footsteps and played for the club in the 1950s.

A key position player, Johnson was mostly used at centre half forward. Johnson began his senior football career with Northcote in the Victorian Football Association (VFA) where he won the competition's best and fairest award the Woodham Cup in 1924.

He was then recruited by Melbourne in 1926 and had an immediate impact on the league. Johnson finished equal second in the 1926 Brownlow Medal and kicked six goals in Melbourne's winning grand final. He also earned Victorian selection at the season's end.

He twice topped Melbourne's goal-kicking during his career, in 1928 with 55 goals and in 1933 with 62.

External links

1902 births
Australian rules footballers from Victoria (Australia)
Melbourne Football Club players
Northcote Football Club players
1981 deaths
Melbourne Football Club Premiership players
One-time VFL/AFL Premiership players